Lee Webb (born November 3, 1981) is a former National Football League fullback for the Jacksonville Jaguars.

College career
Webb played college football at the University of Southern California.

High school career
He went to Crenshaw High School.

Coaching career
Currently in his fifth year coaching Palos Verdes Peninsula High School as the running back coach.

External links
TSN Bio

1981 births
Living people
Players of American football from Inglewood, California
American football running backs
USC Trojans football players
Jacksonville Jaguars players